Compsolechia aequilibris is a moth of the family Gelechiidae. It was described by Edward Meyrick in 1931. It is found in Brazil.

The wingspan is about 17 mm. The hindwings are dark grey.

References

Moths described in 1931
Compsolechia
Taxa named by Edward Meyrick